Airport is a rapid transit station on the  of Hong Kong's MTR system. It serves the Hong Kong International Airport, and is integrated with the passenger terminal. It is also the westernmost railway station in Hong Kong.

History 
The station was built at the same time as the new Hong Kong International Airport, constructed on a platform of reclaimed land in order to replace Kai Tak Airport in the urban core.

In October 1993, the Airport Authority Hong Kong appointed Ove Arup and Partners to develop the concept design for the new airport's Ground Transportation Centre (GTC), which includes Airport station. Arup, Foster and Partners, and Anthony Ng Architects completed the detailed design of the GTC. Construction began in 1995. The main contractor was Nishimatsu Construction.

The station was opened on 6 July 1998 at the same time as the airport, and served as the western terminus station of the line until the opening of the AsiaWorld–Expo station on 20 December 2005.

Platform 3 was constructed opposite to platform 1 to enable access to SkyPlaza and Terminal 2. The new platform began operations on 28 February 2007, when the additional check-in facilities opened at Terminal 2. Until Terminal 2 was closed for expansion on 28 November 2019, Airport Express trains stopping at the station opened its two doors simultaneously for both platforms—doors on the left opened for Terminal 1, and doors on the right opened for Terminal 2 and SkyPlaza.

Station layout

Facilities 

Due to the integration with the airport, no exit or entry gates are installed for the convenience of the travellers. Therefore, travellers can walk straight into the terminal building through the exit for their check-in procedures (if they have not completed In-Town Check-in). Ticket baskets are provided on the departure level for the travellers to dispose of their used tickets in. A souvenir shop is also found there.

Although no entry gates are provided at Airport station, travellers must still buy tickets from the ticket machines located in the Arrivals Hall or on platform 1 of the Airport station before boarding the train.

Entrances/exits 

Trains to AsiaWorld–Expo: Departure level of Terminal 1 (7/F), Departure level of Terminal 2 (L6)
Trains to city: Arrival level of airport (L5)

Travellers who arrive at the Airport can immediately enter the terminal with any baggage they have and walk into the passenger terminal. No exit gates are provided.

References 

MTR stations in the New Territories
Airport Express (MTR)
Chek Lap Kok
Airport railway stations in China
Railway stations in Hong Kong opened in 1998
Hong Kong International Airport